DXCM may refer to:
 DXCM-AM, an AM radio station broadcasting in Kidapawan, Philippines
 DXCM-FM, an FM radio station broadcasting in Zamboanga City, Philippines; branded as Love Radio